The Western Berber languages are a branch of the Berber languages. They comprise two languages:
 Zenaga
 Tetserret

Zenaga is spoken in southwestern Mauritania while Tetserret is spoken in central Niger. They appear to have influenced the Algerian Songhai language Korandje.

The label "Western Berber" was first used in a classificatory sense by Aikhenvald and Militarev (1984) in reference to Zenaga alone. (Tetserret data was not available to them.)

Sound changes characteristic of this subgroup include the reflex of proto-Berber *ww as *bb (elsewhere gg/ggʷ) and *w (elsewhere retained) as *b after consonants; of *x (elsewhere retained) as *k; of *ṭṭ as ḍḍ (elsewhere ṭṭ); and of *ẓ as a voiceless fricative ṣ (Tetserrét) or θ̣ (Zenaga).

Notes

Western Berber languages
Berber languages